Daybreak is a 1948 drama by Riverside Studios – classified by some as 'British Noir' – directed by Compton Bennett and starring Eric Portman, Ann Todd and Maxwell Reed. It is based on a play by Monckton Hoffe.

A sombre, bleak film, Daybreak was filmed in 1946, but ran into trouble with the BBFC, resulting in a delay of almost two years before its release.  The version finally approved for release excised approximately six minutes of original footage, resulting in some jerky cuts where scenes have been removed and leaving noticeable plot lacunae which are considered to detract somewhat from an otherwise well-regarded film.

Plot
The story begins with a hangman breaking down when faced with carrying out his last execution of a condemned man before retiring. The hangman begins to tell his story to the governor and the majority of the plot is then played out in the form of an extended flashback – although many scenes take place in which the supposed narrator is not actually present.

Eddie Mendover (Portman) owns a barber's shop in Gravesend and leads an apparently normal life.  However, he has a second role, known to no one but his assistant, Ron (Bill Owen) – he is, in fact, England's official public hangmen, called on periodically to travel to prisons around the country to perform executions.

He changes his life by making a claim against the estate of Mr Tribe, a barge owner on the Thames. He claims to be his son but has no papers whatsoever to back this claim. One of his father's barge friends is happy to identify Eddie for the price of a few drinks. The solicitor seems happy with this and he inherits 15 barges and a deal of money.

One evening, Eddie goes into his local public house for a drink and a bite to eat and is kind to a stranger who comes in to shelter from the heavy rain. This is the bedraggled Frances who likes to be called Frankie (Todd), who is waiting for a bus to take her to a new job at a nightclub. Although Frankie never says a word about her past, there are implications that she has some kind of shady history, and may even have been a prostitute. [Note: It has been surmised that some of the deleted footage may have made this more explicit.]  The pair fall in love and only then does she ask his surname. He is obliged to say Tribe as it is the name on the barge. They are soon married, and he hands over the barber's shop to Ron and assumes control of the business, setting up home with Frankie on one of the barges, at her request.

Eddie hires a Danish seaman, Olaf (Reed), to work for him, and the arrogant Olaf loses no time in openly flirting with Frankie.  Although somewhat attracted to him, she tries her best to deny these feelings and be the loving and dutiful wife.  This, however, is made more difficult by the fact that Eddie is forced to travel to other towns from time to time for two or three days at a time to fulfil his prison-service obligations and as he does not wish to come clean about these he tells Frankie that he must attend important business meetings, leaving her to increasingly struggle to rebuff Olaf's advances.

When Eddie is next called away, Frankie begs him to either not go or take her with him, but as neither is an option for Eddie, she is left alone and pleads with elderly bargeman, Bill Shackle (Edward Rigby), to stay with her that evening.  Shackle is unable to grant her request due to other commitments and Olaf is quick to make himself at home in the cabin and begin drinking.

As a condemned man has been given a reprieve, Eddie returns unexpectedly and discovers Frankie and Olaf in this compromising situation.  A fight ensues between the two men, during which Eddie is knocked overboard and fails to resurface.  The police arrive and Olaf is arrested for murder, as it is presumed that Eddie's body has been carried away by the tide.  In despair, Frankie commits suicide by shooting herself.  However, Eddie manages to crawl ashore the next morning and goes to his barber shop to clean himself up. It is unclear how he spent the whole night in the Thames.

Ron is unaware of Eddy's alter ego as Tribe (or his marriage). A customer brings a newspaper in and somehow the story of "Eddy's murder" and Frankie's suicide is already in the paper.

Olaf is convicted of murder and sentenced to hang. Eddie is summoned to carry out the execution, and at first sees it as an opportunity to avenge Frankie's death.  When the time comes, however, he is unable to go through with it and confesses his identity to the prison staff.  He returns to the barber's shop. When Ron comes to work the next morning, he finds Eddie's dangling body and dials 999 (emergency telephone number).

Cast
 Eric Portman as Eddie Mendover/Tribe
 Ann Todd as Frances ("Frankie")
 Maxwell Reed as Olaf
 Bill Owen as Ron
 Edward Rigby as Bill Shackle
 Jane Hylton as Doris
 Eliot Makeham as Mr. Bigley
 Margaret Withers as Mrs. Bigley
 John Turnbull as Superintendent
 Maurice Denham as Inspector
 Milton Rosmer as Governor

Production

Ann Todd, Sydney Box and Compton Bennett had enjoyed a huge success with The Seventh Veil (1945).

In July 1945 Box bought the screen rights to a story by Monckton Hoffe called Grim Fairy Tale, intending to make it a vehicle for Todd. Box was impressed by the style and themes of psychological cinemas made before the war in French cinema, and wanted to do a British film along these lines.
 
It was the first film of a new 14-picture quarter-million pound contract between Todd and J. Arthur Rank (she was to make six films with Box and eight with Rank). Crawford's casting was announced in January 1946. It was known at one stage as Streets Paved with Water.

Shooting
Filming started in March 1946 and went for ten weeks. It was the first notable role of Maxwell Reed who had been in The Company of Youth (he later made The Brothers for Box).

Sidney Box's sister Betty worked on the movie. Shooting was difficult with none of the three leads getting along. 
In April 1946 it was reported that Brock Williams was directing.

Post Production
Box saw a rough cut in July 1946 and was unhappy with the result, particularly Bennett's direction and Todd's performance. Over the next six months, Box reworked the script, particularly the beginning and ending. Alan Osbiston was hired to reshoot scenes and re-edit the movie. In January 1947 Muriel Box was still dissatisfied.

Post production was also difficult because of censor objections. Among the scenes altered were a rape scene, gory details of a fight, and a death cell scene.

Due to difficulties with the censors the film was not seen until almost two years after completion, and only after several cuts were made. Another reason given for the delay was that the producers wanted to wait until Todd's first Hollywood movie, The Paradine Case, had been released.

Reception

The film was moderately successful at the British box office but failed to recoup its relatively high cost.

The difficulties with the censor led J. Arthur Rank to refuse to finance a project of Box's, The Killer and the Slain.

References

External links 
 
 
 
 
 
Essay on film at Mubi
Review of film at Variety
Review of film at The New York Times

1948 films
1940s thriller films
British thriller films
British black-and-white films
Films based on works by Monckton Hoffe
Film noir
Films set in London
Films directed by Compton Bennett
Films scored by Benjamin Frankel
Films with screenplays by Muriel Box
Films with screenplays by Sydney Box
Films produced by Sydney Box
1940s English-language films
1940s British films